Travassos is a Portuguesa Freguesia in the municipality of Póvoa de Lanhoso, it has an area of 3.59 km² and 696 inhabitants (2011), 140 people per square kilometer.

Population

References 

Freguesias of Póvoa de Lanhoso